My Original Dream is a 2015 Chinese romantic comedy-drama film directed by Hao Jie. It was released on November 11, 2015.

Cast
Bao Bei'er
Sun Yi
Feng Si

Reception
The film has earned  at the Chinese box office.

References

External links

2015 romantic comedy-drama films
Chinese romantic comedy-drama films
Wanda Pictures films